Angelo Amato, S.D.B. (born 8 June 1938) is an Italian cardinal of the Catholic Church who served as the Prefect of the Congregation for the Causes of Saints between 2008 and 2018. He served as Secretary of the Congregation for the Doctrine of the Faith from 2002 to 2008 and became a cardinal in 2010.

Education
Amato was born in Molfetta, Apulia, Italy. He entered the Salesians after completing his novitiate at a Salesian high school. He studied philosophy and theology.

He was ordained a priest on 22 December 1967, becoming a member of the Salesians of Saint John Bosco. He studied at the Salesian Pontifical University gaining a licentiate in philosophy, specializing in Christology. In 1972 he began to teach at the Salesian as an assistant. In 1974 he obtained his doctorate at the Pontifical Gregorian University with a dissertation on The Tridentine pronouncements on the need for sacramental confession in canons 6–9, Session XIV. 

In the years 1978 to 1979 he was a fellow of the Ecumenical Patriarchate of Constantinople in Thessaloniki, Greece, at the monastery Orthodox Moní Vlatádon, home of the renowned Institute of patristic studies. In 1988 he spent a sabbatical year in Washington, DC, USA, where he began to study the theology of religions.

Academic life

He was professor of dogmatics at the Salesian Pontifical University, and for twelve years (from 1981 to 1987 and then 1993 to 1997) was dean of the Faculty of Theology. 

He served as a consultor to the Congregation for the Doctrine of the Faith and the Pontifical Council for Promoting Christian Unity as well as for the Congregation for Bishops.

His publications include: Trinità in contesto, Biblioteca di Scienze Religiose 110 (Roma: LAS, 1994);  La Catechesi al traguardo. Studi sul Catechismo della Chiesa Cattolica, a cura di Angelo Amato, Enrico dal Covolo e Achille M. Triacca, Biblioteca di Scienze Religiose 127 (Roma: LAS, 1997); Il vangelo del Padre (Bologna: EDB, 1998); Gesù il Signore. Saggio di cristologia, Corso di Teologia Sistematica 4 (Bologna: EDB, 1999); Maria e la Trinità. Spiritualità mariana ed esistenza cristiana – Alma Mater (Roma: San Paolo Edizioni, 2000); Il celibato di Gesù (Città del Vaticano: Libreria Editrice Vaticana, 2010); I santi della chiesa (Città del Vaticano: Libreria Editrice Vaticana, 2010).

Secretary of the Congregation for the Doctrine of the Faith

On 19 December 2002, Pope John Paul II appointed him as Secretary of the Congregation for the Doctrine of the Faith and titular archbishop of Sila. He was consecrated bishop on 6 January 2003 by Pope John Paul II.

In addition to his role as CDF Secretary, Amato served as a consultor to the Pontifical Councils for Christian Unity and Interreligious Dialogue.

In an April 2007 address to chaplains, he denounced same-sex marriage and abortion and criticized the Italian media's coverage of them. He said that they are evils "that remain almost invisible" due to media presentation of them as an "expression of human progress."

Church treatment of Galileo Galilei
According to Amato, a 1633 letter discovered in the Vatican's archive proved that the Roman Inquisition, the predecessor of his Congregation, had not persecuted Galileo Galilei for  maintaining that the Earth goes round the Sun. The letter from the Commissioner of the Holy Office to Francesco Barberini expressed the Pope's concern that the trial of the scientist accused of heresy be concluded quickly as his health was poor. Archbishop Amato said the letter proved that the church's attitude to the great astronomer was benign.

Prefect of the Congregation for the Causes of Saints

After the 2005 Papal conclave, Amato was the first person received in private audience by the new Pope Benedict XVI, who until his election had been Prefect of the Congregation of which Amato continued to be Secretary until 9 July 2008, when Pope Benedict named him Prefect of the Congregation for the Causes of Saints. Thus, Amato oversees the process which leads to the canonisation of saints, which includes preparing a case, including the approval of certified miracles. The case is presented to the pope, who decides whether or not to proceed with beatification or canonisation. Amato is the second CDF Secretary to lead the Causes of Saints dicastery, the first being Alberto Bovone. 

On 6 July 2010 he was appointed a member of the Congregation for Divine Worship and the Discipline of the Sacraments. On 16 October 2010 he was appointed by Pope Benedict as a member of the Congregation for the Doctrine of the Faith for a five-year renewable term. It will be renewed until his 80th birthday. Being resident in Rome, he is invited to attend not only the plenary meetings of those departments, which in principle are held every year, but also the ordinary meetings. 

Amato was created Cardinal-Deacon of S. Maria in Aquiro by Pope Benedict XVI in the consistory of 20 November 2010. 

On 29 December 2010, Cardinal Amato was appointed member of the Pontifical Council for Promoting Christian Unity.

On Friday 14 January 2011, Pope Benedict XVI signed a decree attributing a miracle to the intercession of Pope John Paul II, clearing the way for his beatification on 1 May 2011. Amato said that the "Papal dispensation of the 5-year waiting period before opening a cause, and the second was the placing of the cause on a 'fast track' that by-passed the waiting list. There were, however, no corners cut with regard to the rigor and accuracy of procedure. The case was treated like any other, following all the steps prescribed by the law of the Congregation for the Causes of Saints. On the contrary, if I may speak further to one of my first observations: precisely in order to honor the dignity and the memory of this great Pope, to avoid any doubt and overcome any difficulties, the case was subjected to particularly careful scrutiny."

Amato was considered papabile for the papal conclave of 2013 that elected Pope Francis.

His replacement by Giovanni Angelo Becciu as Prefect of the Congregation for the Causes of Saints as of 31 August was announced on 26 May 2018.

After ten years at the rank of cardinal deacon, he exercised his option to assume the rank of cardinal priest, which Pope Francis confirmed on 3 May 2021.

See also
Blessed Martyrs of Drina
Cardinals created by Benedict XVI

References

External links

 

 
 

 
 

Living people
21st-century Italian Roman Catholic titular archbishops
1938 births
Members of the Congregation for the Doctrine of the Faith
Members of the Congregation for the Causes of Saints
Members of the Congregation for Divine Worship and the Discipline of the Sacraments
Pontifical Gregorian University alumni
Salesian Pontifical University alumni
Cardinals created by Pope Benedict XVI
21st-century Italian cardinals
Salesian cardinals